The original St. Johns River Bridge was a four-lane concrete-and-steel causeway bridge constructed over the St. Johns River at the west outlet of Lake Monroe.  It is a part of Interstate 4, and spans the border between Seminole and Volusia Counties in Florida, United States.  On the Seminole side is Sanford and on the Volusia side is DeBary.

The bridge's design, which lacked shoulders for disabled or wrecked vehicles to pull out of the flow of traffic, made it a severe bottleneck for commuters going to the Orlando Area beginning in the 1980s.  A series of fatal traffic collisions on it and similarly-designed bridges statewide, most notably the Interstate 75 Lake Panasoffkee Bridge, led to a move in 2000 to use state emergency bridge funds similar to the contingency funds used to rebuild the Sunshine Skyway Bridge to begin planned reconstruction.  Work began in 2001, and a new dual structure consisting of two three-lane spans, each with wide shoulders on either side, was fully opened in May 2004.  The old bridge was dismantled over the next few months.  Upon completion, the new structure was officially renamed the St. Johns River Veterans Memorial Bridge.

See also 
 
 
 
 List of crossings of the St. Johns River

References

External links 
St. Johns River Veterans Memorial Bridge
St. Johns River Veterans Memorial Bridge - docs

Bridges in Seminole County, Florida
Bridges in Volusia County, Florida
Monuments and memorials in Florida
Bridges completed in 1960
Bridges completed in 2004
Road bridges in Florida
Bridges over the St. Johns River
Bridges on the Interstate Highway System
1960 establishments in Florida
Concrete bridges in the United States
Girder bridges in the United States